Lashmar Zamakh (also Romanized as Lash Mar Zomokh and Leshmarzemakh) is a village in Ziabar Rural District, in the Central District of Sowme'eh Sara County, Gilan Province, Iran. At the 2006 census, its population was 259, in 77 families.

References 

Populated places in Sowme'eh Sara County